Paruro Province is one of thirteen provinces in the Cusco Region in the southern highlands of Peru.

The provincial capital of Paruro, with population of 3,855, lies at 3,057 meters (10,032 ft) altitude.  Two and a half hours by bus from Cusco, in the bottom of a deep valley, it is bordered on one side by the Rio Paruro, a feeder of the Apurímac  River. A number of small Inca and pre-Inca ruins are in the area, and a series of arches built by Simón Bolívar to celebrate a victory over the Spaniards.

Nearby Paqariq Tampu is one of the legendary origin sites of Manqu Qhapaq and Mama Uqllu, founders of the Inca Empire.

Boundaries
 North: Anta Province and Cusco Province
 East: Quispicanchi Province, Acomayo Province and Chumbivilcas Province
 South: Chumbivilcas Province
 West: Chumbivilcas Province and Apurímac Region

Geography 
Some of the highest mountains of the province are listed below:

Political division
The province is divided into nine districts, each of which is headed by a mayor (alcalde). The districts, with their capitals in parenthesis, are:

 Accha (Accha)
 Ccapi (Ccapi)
 Colcha (Colcha)
 Huanoquite (Huanoquite)
 Omacha (Omacha)
 Paccaritambo (Paccaritambo)
 Paruro (Paruro)
 Pillpinto (Pillpinto)
 Yaurisque (Yaurisque)

Ethnic groups 
The people in the province are mainly indigenous citizens of Quechua descent. Quechua is the language which the majority of the population (92.09%) learnt to speak in childhood, 7.56% of the residents started speaking in Spanish (2007 Peru Census).

See also 
 Mawk'allaqta

References

Provinces of the Cusco Region